Lim Ha-ram (born 18 November 1990) is a South Korean footballer who plays as a centre-back for Suwon FC in South Korea's top-tier football league, the K League Classic. He has previously played for Gwangju FC and Incheon United.

Club career

Lim was a priority pick from the 2011 K-League draft for Gwangju FC's roster in their foundation season in the K-League. Lim made his professional debut in a 0–1 League Cup loss to Busan I'Park on 6 April 2011, earning a yellow card late in the match.

Club career statistics

References

External links 

1990 births
Living people
Association football defenders
South Korean footballers
Gwangju FC players
Incheon United FC players
Suwon FC players
K League 1 players
K League 2 players